The , abbreviated DYLJ or , is a political youth organisation in Japan. It is the youth wing of the Japanese Communist Party, as well as an organisational body of Zengakuren. Minsei describes itself as a "voluntary youth organisation in response to a keen demand of the youth, aiming towards a better life, peace, independence, democracy and social progress". Its main activities are the peace movement, opposition to tuition hikes, petitions, volunteer work and educational activities and the like.

History
The DYLJ was formed on 5 April 1923 in the Empire of Japan as the Japanese Communist Youth League, influenced by the Russian Revolution in Russia. Like the JCP, it focused on suffrage for young Japanese aged 18 and above, the overthrow of the "Emperor system", equal pay for equal work and opposition of militarisation. Also, like the JCP, it was banned under the Peace Preservation Law and some of its members, like Yoshitora Kawai were captured by police, killed or died in prison.

After World War II, the Japan Youth Communist League was established. Later on, it was renamed the Japan Democratic Youth League. After the return of the JCP's ideology of scientific socialism, it was renamed the Democratic Youth League of Japan. In 1960, during its 6th National Congress, the League 
established their Agreement and "Call to the Youth League", both of which shaped the DYLJ's present character.

References

External links

Japanese Communist Party
Youth wings of communist parties
Youth wings of political parties in Japan